Torres Llaves de Oro is the complex of twin skyscrapers Torre Llaves de Oro 1 and Torre Llaves de Oro 2. They are located in Valencia, Spain. Completed in 2003, has 26 floors and rises 90 metres. These are some of the tallest buildings in the city, lower than Hilton Valencia, Torre de Francia, Aqua Multiespacio; have the same height as the very similar Ademuz buildings.

See also 

 List of tallest buildings in Valencia

References 

Skyscrapers in Valencia
Residential buildings completed in 2003
Residential skyscrapers in Spain